This is a list of notable events in music that took place in the year 1979.

Specific locations
1979 in British music
1979 in Norwegian music

Specific genres
1979 in country music
1979 in heavy metal music
1979 in hip hop music
1979 in jazz

Events

January–February
 January 1
 Bill Graham closes San Francisco's Winterland Ballroom following a New Year's Eve performance by the Blues Brothers and the Grateful Dead.
 During a New Year's Eve concert in Cleveland, Ohio, Bruce Springsteen is injured when a firecracker is thrown onstage from the audience.
 January 4 – The Star-Club in Hamburg, Germany, known for its connections to the early days of the Beatles, reopened.
 January 6 – ABC's American Bandstand featured the debut of the "Y.M.C.A. dance" using the hand gestures forming the letters YMCA during a broadcast with the Village People.
 January 9 – The Music for UNICEF Concert in held in New York City at the United Nations, starring the Bee Gees. Highlights are aired the following evening on NBC.
 January 13 – Singer Donny Hathaway dies after falling 15 stories from his hotel room in New York City. According to Hathaway's record company, Atlantic, the singer had been having some psychological problems.
 January 15 – MCA Records purchases ABC Records for a reported $20 million.
 February 2 – Sex Pistols bassist Sid Vicious is found dead from an overdose, a day after being released on bail from Rikers Island prison.
 February 7
 The Clash kicked off their first concert of their first American tour at the Berkeley Community Theatre outside San Francisco. Bo Diddley opened the show.
 Stephen Stills becomes the first major rock artist to record digitally, laying down four songs at The Record Plant in Los Angeles.
 February 10 – Rod Stewart's "Do Ya Think I'm Sexy" hit No. 1 on the Billboard magazine charts, and stayed there for 4 weeks.
 February 11 – 43 million viewers watch "Elvis!" on ABC, a made-for-TV movie starring Kurt Russell as Elvis.
 February 14 – Following her 1972 sex reassignment surgery, musician Wendy Carlos legally changes her name from Walter. She reveals this information in an interview in the May 1979 issue of Playboy magazine.
 February 15
 Minnie Riperton appears on the Grammys as a presenter with Stephen Bishop. 
 The 21st Annual Grammy Awards are presented in Los Angeles, hosted by John Denver. The Bee Gees collect 4 Grammys for the Saturday Night Fever soundtrack, including Album of the Year, while Billy Joel's "Just the Way You Are" wins both Record of the Year and Song of the Year. A Taste of Honey win Best New Artist.
 February 23 – Dire Straits begin their first U.S. tour in Boston.
 February 24
 Friedrich Cerha's completion of Alban Berg's opera Lulu is premiered at the Opera Garnier in Paris.
 Singer Johnnie Wilder, Jr. of Heatwave is paralyzed from the neck down in a car accident in his hometown of Dayton, Ohio.
 February 26 – B.B. King becomes the first blues artist to tour the Soviet Union, kicking off a one-month tour there.

March–April
 March 2–4 – Weather Report, The CBS Jazz All-Stars, the Trio of Doom, Fania All-Stars, Stephen Stills, Billy Swan, Bonnie Bramlett, Mike Finnegan, Kris Kristofferson, Rita Coolidge and Billy Joel, plus Cuban acts Irakere, Pacho Alonso, Elena Burke, Los Papines, Tata Güines and Orquesta Aragón play at the historic three-day Havana Jam festival at the Karl Marx Theater, in Havana, Cuba.
 March 5 – MCA Records dissolves ABC Records.
 March 10 – James Brown performs at the Grand Ole Opry.
 March 15 – Elvis Costello gets into a heated argument with members of Stephen Stills' touring entourage at a Holiday Inn in Columbus, Ohio. After Costello makes disparaging remarks about America, he is punched by Bonnie Bramlett. Costello suffers a wave of negative press coverage after the incident is made public.
 March 21 – The Pretenders sign a contract with Sire Records.
 March 27 – 
Eric Clapton marries Patti Boyd, ex-wife of Clapton's friend George Harrison.
 Simple Minds make their first television appearance, performing the songs "Chelsea Girl" and "Life in a Day" on BBC's The Old Grey Whistle Test.
 March 31 – The Eurovision Song Contest, the biggest music festival in the world, takes place for the first time in a country outside Europe – Israel. The show is broadcast live from Jerusalem to Europe and a few countries in Asia. The big winner of this night is Israel for the second time in a row. The winning song is "Hallelujah" sung by the group Milk and Honey, including Gali Atari. A few months after winning the song had been translated into more than 82 languages, and broke a new record by entering the Guinness Book of Records as the most translated song in the world.
 April 2 – Kate Bush begins her first, and for 35 years, only tour. She becomes the first artist to use a wireless microphone, enabling her to sing and dance at the same time.
 April 6 – Rod Stewart marries Alana Hamilton.
 April 7 – 110,000 people attend the California Music Festival at the L.A. Memorial Coliseum. Performers include Aerosmith, The Boomtown Rats, Cheap Trick, Ted Nugent and Van Halen.
 April 12 – Mickey Thomas replaces Marty Balin as the lead singer of Jefferson Starship.
 April 13 – During a concert by Van Halen in Spokane, Washington, David Lee Roth collapses from exhaustion. A local doctor treats him for a stomach virus and advises him to "calm down".
 April 22 – The New Barbarians and The Rolling Stones perform two concerts in Oshawa, Ontario to benefit the CNIB, as part of Keith Richards' 1978 sentence for heroin possession.
 April 24 – The New Barbarians open their US tour at Ann Arbor, Michigan.
 April 27 – Ozzy Osbourne is fired as lead singer of Black Sabbath. He is replaced in May by Ronnie James Dio.

May–August
 May 1 – Elton John becomes the first pop music star to perform in Israel.
 May 2 – The Who play their first concert following the death of drummer Keith Moon. The band performs with new drummer Kenney Jones at London's Rainbow Theatre.
 May 4 – Release as a single of Gary Numan's "Are "Friends" Electric?" with Tubeway Army; it becomes the first synth-pop single to reach number one in the UK Singles Chart.
 May 8
 Iron Maiden, Samson, and Angel Witch share a bill at the Music Machine in Camden, London. Critic Geoff Barton coins the term "New Wave of British Heavy Metal" in a review of the show for Sounds magazine.
 The Cure release their debut album "Three Imaginary Boys" (Boys Don't Cry in US, Australia)
 May 12 – Disco occupies eight of the top ten spots of the Billboard Hot 100 chart, for two weeks. The charts are led by Peaches and Herb's R&B ballad single "Reunited".
 May 14 – Kate Bush plays the final date at the Hammersmith Odeon on her first-ever tour, which also turned out to be her last tour. 
 May 19 – Three of the four ex-Beatles perform on the same stage, as Paul McCartney, George Harrison and Ringo Starr jam with Eric Clapton, Ginger Baker, Mick Jagger and others at a wedding reception for Clapton at his Surrey home.
 May 21 – Elton John plays the first of eight concerts in the Soviet Union, making him the first western solo pop artist to tour there.
 June 1 – Alternative Tentacles record label established by Dead Kennedys frontman Jello Biafra.
 June 8 – Marianne Faithfull marries Ben Brierly of The Vibrators.
 June 9 – The Bee Gees tie Bing Crosby, Elvis Presley, and The Beatles with a record six consecutive number-one singles in the U.S. in less than a single calendar year with "Love You Inside Out".
 June 16 – Donna Summer becomes the first female to have the #1 single "Hot Stuff" and album Bad Girls for a second time.
 June 28 – Bill Haley makes his final studio recordings at Muscle Shoals, Alabama.
 June 30 
Donna Summer becomes the first female artist to have 2 of the top 3 songs, Hot Stuff at #1 & Bad Girls at #3, on the Billboard Hot 100 chart. They will stay in the top 3 together for 4 weeks. In fact, all of the top 5 songs that week are entirely by women, both in Billboard and in Cashbox.
Tubeway Army reach number 1 on the UK Singles Chart with "Are 'Friends' Electric?" and become the first British act to have a synth pop hit single. The song will remain at number 1 for four consecutive weeks.
 July – EMI's first non-classical digital recording, of UK jazz-funk duo Morrissey–Mullen covering the Rose Royce hit "Love Don't Live Here Anymore", is recorded at Abbey Road Studios and later released as a limited edition vinyl EP.
 July 1 – The Sony Walkman goes on sale in Japan.
 July 7 – The Bee Gees play to a sold-out crowd at Los Angeles' Dodger Stadium as part of their Spirits Having Flown tour.
 July 10 – Chuck Berry is sentenced to four months in prison for tax evasion by a Los Angeles judge.
 July 12 – "Disco Demolition Night", an anti-disco promotional event held by a Chicago rock station at Comiskey Park involving exploding disco records with a bomb, causes a near-riot between games during a baseball major league doubleheader, forcing the cancellation of the second game.
 July 14 – Donna Summer, for a third time in an eight-month period, scores a #1 single with "Bad Girls", (staying atop the charts for five weeks); and #1 album of the same name, which also tops the Billboard 200 for six weeks.
 July 21 
With Bad Girls (both single and album), Donna Summer's success continues as she becomes the first female artist to sit on top of 3 major Billboard charts: the Billboard Hot 100, the Hot Soul Singles chart, and the Billboard 200. Disco dominates the Billboard Hot 100 chart, with the first six spots (beginning with Donna Summer's  "Bad Girls"), and seven of the chart's top ten songs ending that week.
Tubeway Army reach number 1 on the UK Albums Chart with "Replicas".
 July 28 – Aerosmith and Ted Nugent headline the World Series of Rock at Municipal Stadium in Cleveland, Ohio. Also on the bill are Journey, Thin Lizzy, AC/DC and the Scorpions. Following the concert, Aerosmith guitarist Joe Perry quits the group after an argument with bandmates.
 July 31 – 250,000 turn out in Central Park for a free concert by James Taylor in a campaign to restore Sheep Meadow.
 August – Elton John and lyricist Bernie Taupin, having reunited after a three-year break, eventually record their first compositions since then, to be released a year later as 21 at 33.
 August 6 - Bauhaus releases debut single "Bela Lugosi's Dead", considered to be the first Gothic Rock release.
 August 18 – Nick Lowe and Carlene Carter are married at Carter's Los Angeles home.
 August 24 – Prince's first hit single "I Wanna Be Your Lover" is released in the US, reaching number one on the RnB and number 11 on the Hot 100, selling more than one million copies in the US.
 August 25 – "My Sharona" by The Knack hits #1 on the Billboard charts.  This is the first time in over a year that a song hits #1 that is not either a disco song or a ballad, signalling the potential resurgence of rock.

September–December
 September 1 – INXS perform in public for the first time, at the Oceanview Hotel in Umina, New South Wales.
 September 2 – U2 enters the studio for the first time to record a locally released single.
 September 13 – ABBA begins ABBA: The Tour in Edmonton, Alberta, leading off a month of dates in North America.
 September 16 – The Sugarhill Gang release Rapper's Delight in the United States, the first rap single to become a Top 40 hit on the Billboard Hot 100.
 September 17 – Ontario Court of Appeals rejects a government appeal against the previous year's sentencing of Keith Richards, which allowed him to avoid jail time for his 1977 arrest in Toronto for heroin possession.
 September 19–23 – Musicians United for Safe Energy (MUSE) stages a series of five No Nukes concerts at Madison Square Garden. Jackson Browne, Crosby, Stills & Nash, Bruce Springsteen and the E Street Band, Bonnie Raitt, Tom Petty, James Taylor and Carly Simon are among the participants.
 September 22
Gary Numan hits number 1 on the UK Albums Chart with The Pleasure Principle, only two months after his Tubeway Army album Replicas had topped the chart.
The NewMusic, a Canadian weekly music and culture program, makes its début on Citytv.
 September 27 – Elton John collapses on stage at the Universal Amphitheatre in Los Angeles County, California while performing "Better Off Dead". He refuses to stop the show and resumes playing fifteen minutes later.
 October 10 – Joe Perry officially leaves Aerosmith.
 November 3 – Donna Summer becomes the first female artist to have 5 top 10 hits in the same year.
 November 16 – Infinity Records is shut down and absorbed into parent company MCA.
 November 17 – Donna Summer, for a second time, has two songs ("Dim All the Lights", #2, & "No More Tears (Enough is Enough)" with Barbra Streisand, #3) in the Top 3 of the Billboard Hot 100, and the first female to have 5 top 5 hits in the same year.
 November 24 – With "No More Tears (Enough is Enough)" hitting the top spot, Donna Summer becomes the first female artist to score 3 #1 singles in a calendar year on the Billboard Hot 100 charts.
 November 26 – Bill Haley & His Comets perform at the Theatre Royal, Drury Lane, London, in a command performance for Queen Elizabeth II. This was Haley's final recorded performance of "Rock Around the Clock".
 November 30 – Pink Floyd releases The Wall. It is one of rock's most well-known concept albums and one of the best-selling albums of all time. It is also the last album recorded with the line up of David Gilmour, Roger Waters, Nick Mason and Richard Wright.
 December – Iron Maiden is signed by EMI. They hire Dennis Stratton as a second guitarist.
 December 3 – In Cincinnati, a stampede for seats at Riverfront Coliseum during a Who concert kills 11 fans and injures 26 others.  Band members were not informed of the deaths until after the show.
 December 26 – Iron Maiden drummer Doug Sampson is replaced by ex-Samson drummer Clive Burr.
 December 26-29 – The Concerts for the People of Kampuchea are held over four nights at the Hammersmith Odeon in London to raise funds for victims of war in Cambodia. Queen, The Who, The Clash, Wings, Elvis Costello and members of Led Zeppelin all take part.
 December 31 – The eighth annual New Year's Rockin' Eve special airs on ABC, with appearances by The Oak Ridge Boys, Village People, Chic, Blondie and Barry Manilow.

Also in 1979
 The Welsh Philharmonia becomes the Orchestra of Welsh National Opera.
 Michael Schenker leaves Scorpions during their tour in France and is replaced by Matthias Jabs.
 Stevie Wonder uses digital audio recording technology in recording his album Journey through the Secret Life of Plants.
 Disco reigns supreme this year, with several number-one hits from The Bee Gees and Donna Summer. Several artists who were not regarded as disco acts, scored major successes by releasing disco-oriented singles or albums, including new wave band Blondie with their first US number-one single "Heart of Glass", Rod Stewart with "Do Ya Think I'm Sexy?", and symphonic rock band Electric Light Orchestra with their UK No. 1 LP Discovery.

Bands formed
See Musical groups established in 1979

Bands disbanded
See Musical groups disestablished in 1979

Albums released

January

February

March

April

May

June

July

August

September

October

November

December

Release date unknown

Biggest hit singles
The following songs achieved the highest chart positions in the charts of 1979.

Chronological list of US and UK number-one hit singles
US number-one singles and artist  (weeks at No. 1)

"Babe" – Styx (2)
"Bad Girls" – Donna Summer (5)
"Da Ya Think I'm Sexy?" – Rod Stewart (4)
"Don't Stop 'Til You Get Enough" – Michael Jackson (1)
"Escape (The Piña Colada Song)" – Rupert Holmes (2 weeks in 1979 + 1 week in 1980)
"Good Times" – Chic (1)
"Heart of Glass" – Blondie (1)
"Heartache Tonight" – The Eagles (1)
"Hot Stuff" – Donna Summer (3)
"I Will Survive" – Gloria Gaynor (3)
"Knock on Wood" – Amii Stewart (1)
"Le Freak" – Chic (3 weeks in 1978 + 3 weeks in 1979)
"Love You Inside Out" – Bee Gees (1)
"My Sharona" – The Knack (6)
"No More Tears (Enough is Enough)" – Barbra Streisand & Donna Summer (2)
"Pop Muzik" – M (1)
"Reunited" – Peaches & Herb (4)
"Ring My Bell" – Anita Ward (2)
"Rise" – Herb Alpert (2)
"Sad Eyes" – Robert John (1)
"Still" – Commodores (1)
"Too Much Heaven" – Bee Gees (2)
"Tragedy" – Bee Gees (2)
"What a Fool Believes" – The Doobie Brothers (1)
 Also see: Hot 100 No. 1 Hits of 1979

UK number-one singles and artist  (weeks at No. 1)

"Another Brick in the Wall, Part II" – Pink Floyd (3 weeks in 1979 + 2 weeks in 1980)
"Are 'Friends' Electric?" – Tubeway Army (4)
"Bright Eyes" – Art Garfunkel (6)
"Cars" – Gary Numan (1)
"Heart of Glass" – Blondie (4)
"Hit Me With Your Rhythm Stick" – Ian Dury and The Blockheads (1)
"I Don't Like Mondays" – The Boomtown Rats (4)
"I Will Survive" – Gloria Gaynor (4)
"Message in a Bottle" – The Police (3)
"One Day at a Time" – Lena Martell (3)
"Ring My Bell" – Anita Ward (2)
"Sunday Girl" – Blondie (3)
"Tragedy" – Bee Gees (2)
"Video Killed the Radio Star" – The Buggles (1)
"Walking on the Moon" – The Police (1)
"We Don't Talk Anymore" – Cliff Richard (4)
"When You're in Love with a Beautiful Woman" – Dr. Hook (3)
"Y.M.C.A." – Village People (3)

Top 40 Chart hit singles

Other Chart hit singles

Notable singles

Other Notable singles

Published popular music
 "Don't Cry Out Loud" w. Carole Bayer Sager m. Peter Allen
 "The Facts of Life" w.m. Alan Thicke, Gloria Loring, and Al Burton, from the TV series of the same name
 "I'd Rather Leave While I'm In Love" w.m. Carole Bayer Sager & Peter Allen
 "Knots Landing theme" m. Jerrold Immel
 "The Rainbow Connection" w.m. Kenny Ascher & Paul Williams, from the film The Muppet Movie
 "Sultans of Swing" w.m. Mark Knopfler

Classical music
 Arno Babadjanian – Third String Quartet
 Milton Babbitt
An Elizabethan Sextette, for six female voices
Images, for saxophone and tape
Paraphrases, for ten instruments
 Osvaldas Balakauskas – Symphony No. 2
 Pascal Bentoiu – Symphony No. 5, Op. 26 
 Luciano Berio – Scena
 Harrison Birtwistle – ... agm ..., for sixteen voices and three instrumental ensembles
 John Cage
Hymns and Variations, for twelve amplified voices
Roaratorio for tape
 George Crumb
 Apparition for soprano and amplified piano
 Celestial Mechanics (Makrokosmos IV) for amplified piano (four hands)
 Star-Child (1977, revised 1979) for soprano, antiphonal children's voices, male speaking choir, bell ringers, and large orchestra
 Mario Davidovsky – Pennplay for sixteen players
 Peter Maxwell Davies
Black Pentecost, for mezzo-soprano, baritone, and orchestra, Op. 82
Kirkwall Shopping Songs, for young voices and instruments, Op. 85
Nocturne, for alto flute solo, Op. 84
Quiet Memory of Bob Jennings, for violin, viola, and cello, WoO 135
Salome, concert suite from the ballet, Op. 80b
Solstice of Light, cantata for tenor, SATB chorus, and organ, Op. 83
 Morton Feldman
String Quartet No. 1
Violin and Orchestra
 Hugh Flynn – Birds
 Philip Glass
Dance (Dances 1, 3 and 5, with Lucinda Childs and Sol LeWitt), for ensemble
Mad Rush, for piano or electric organ
 Alexander Goehr
Babylon the Great Is Fallen, cantata, Op. 40
Chaconne for organ, Op. 34a
Das Gesetz der Quadrille, Op. 41
Sinfonia, Op. 42
 Cristóbal Halffter
Officium defunctuorum, for orchestra and chorus
Violin Concerto No. 1
 Jacques Hétu – Bassoon Concerto
 Vagn Holmboe
 Violin Concerto No. 2
 Notater for 3 trombones (alto, tenor, baritone) and tuba
 Konstateringer for choir
 Guitar Sonata No. 1
 Guitar Sonata No. 2
 Accordion Sonata No. 1
 Bogtrykkemaskinen for violin and piano
 Miloslav Kabelac – Metamorphoses II, for piano and orchestra, Op. 58
 Wojciech Kilar –
Fanfare for mixed choir and orchestra
Hoary Fog (Siwa mgła), for baritone and orchestra
 Witold Lutosławski – Novelette for orchestra
 William Lloyd Webber – Missa Sanctae Mariae Magdalenae
 Tomás Marco
Aria de la batalla, for organ
Tartessos, for four percussionists 
 Richard Meale – Viridian, for orchestra
 Paul Moravec
 Ave Verum Corpus, for SATB chorus
 Missa Miserere, for SATB chorus and orchestra
 Pater Noster, for SATB chorus
 Ștefan Niculescu – Sincronie for flute, oboe and bassoon
 Allan Pettersson – Viola Concerto
 Steve Reich
Octet
Variations for Winds, Strings and Keyboards
 R. Murray Schafer
Beauty and the Beast, from Patria 3, for alto with masks and string quartet
Felix's Girls, from Patria 3, for SATB quartet or choir
Gamelan, from Patria 3, for SATB, SASA, or TBTB solo quartet or choir
Hear Me Out from Patria 3, for four speaking voices
Music for Wilderness Lake, for twelve trombones and small rural lake
Ontario Variations on a theme by Jack Behrens (one variation), for piano, contribution to collective work by Ontario composers
 Peter Sculthorpe
Four Little Pieces, for piano duet
Mangrove, for orchestra
Requiem, for cello alone
 Denis Smalley – The Pulses of Time, electronic music
 Roger Smalley – String Quartet
 Michael Tippett – Triple Concerto for violin, viola, and cello
 Anatol Vieru
Concerto for violin, cello, and orchestra
Iosif si fratii sai, for eleven instruments and tape
 Malcolm Williamson – Fanfarade, for orchestra
 Charles Wuorinen
Fortune, for clarinet, violin, cello, and piano
Joan's, for flute, clarinet, violin, cello, and piano
The Magic Art, instrumental masque, for chamber orchestra
Percussion Duo, for mallet instruments and piano
Psalm 39, for baritone and guitar
String Quartet No. 2
Three Songs, for tenor and piano
 Iannis Xenakis
Anémoessa, for SATB chorus of 42 or 84 voices and orchestra
Dikhthas, for violin and piano
Palimpsest, for cor anglais, bass clarinet, bassoon, horn, percussion, piano, and string quintet

Opera
 Peter Maxwell Davies
Cinderella, Op. 87
The Lighthouse, Op. 86
 Hossein Dehlavi – Mana and Mani 
 Libby Larsen – The Silver Fox
 Roger Smalley – William Derrincourt (Perth, 31 August)

Jazz

Musical theatre
 Ain't Misbehavin' (Music: Fats Waller, Lyrics: Various Book: Murray Horwitz & Richard Maltby, Jr.). London production opened at Her Majesty's Theatre on March 22.
 Carmelina (Book: Alan Jay Lerner & Joseph Stein Lyrics: Alan Jay Lerner Music: Burton Lane) Broadway production opened at the St. James Theatre on April 8 and ran for 17 performances.  Starring Georgia Brown and Cesare Siepi
 Evita (Music: Andrew Lloyd Webber, Lyrics and Book: Tim Rice). Broadway production opened at the Broadway Theatre on September 25 and ran for 1567 performances
 The King and I London revival opened at the Palladium on June 12 and ran for 538 performances
 My Old Friends (Music, Lyrics and Book: Mel Mandel and Norman Sachs). Off-Broadway production opened at the Orpheum Theatre on January 12 and transferred to the 22 Steps Theatre on Broadway on April 12 for a total run of 154 performances.
 Oklahoma! (Music: Richard Rodgers, Lyrics and Book: Oscar Hammerstein II) – Broadway revival opened at the Palace Theatre on December 13 and ran for 310 performances
 Peter Pan (Music: Mark Charlap, Lyrics and Book: Carolyn Leigh with additional songs, Music: Jule Styne and Lyrics: Betty Comden & Adolph Green).  Broadway revival opened at the Lunt-Fontanne Theatre on September 6 and ran for 551 performances.
 Saravà (Music: Mitch Leigh, Lyrics and Book: N. Richard Nash).  Broadway production opened at the Mark Hellinger Theatre on February 23 and ran for 140 performances
 Sugar Babies Broadway revue opened at the Mark Hellinger Theatre on October 8 and ran for 1208 performances.
 Sweeney Todd (Music and Lyrics: Stephen Sondheim, Book: Hugh Wheeler) – Broadway production opened at the Uris Theatre on March 1 and ran for 557 performances
 They're Playing Our Song (Music: Marvin Hamlisch, Lyrics: Carole Bayer Sager, Book: Neil Simon). Broadway production opened at the Imperial Theatre on February 11 and ran for 1082 performances
 Tommy London production opened at Queen's Theatre on February 6 and ran for 118 performances
 The Venetian Twins (Music: Terence Clarke, Lyrics and Book: Nick Enright). Opened at the Sydney Opera House Drama Theatre on October 26.
 Whoopee (Music: Walter Donaldson, Lyrics: Gus Kahn, Book: William Anthony McGuire). Broadway revival opened at the ANTA Theatre on February 14 and ran for 212 performances.

Musical films
 All That Jazz
 Balada pro banditu
 Hair
 Metamorphoses
 The Muppet Movie
 The Music Machine
 Ochen sinjaja boroda (animation)
 Oolkatal
 Radio On
 Rock 'n' Roll High School
 Roller Boogie
 The Rose
 Schlager
 Skatetown, U.S.A.

Births
 January 1 
 Brody Dalle, Australian singer-songwriter and guitarist 
 Koichi Domoto, Japanese singer-songwriter and actor 
 January 5 – Kathleen Edwards, Canadian singer/musician
 January 7 – Aloe Blacc,  American musician, singer, songwriter, record producer, actor, businessman, and philanthropist
 January 10 – Christopher Smith, singer-songwriter (Kris Kross)
 January 11 – Siti Nurhaliza, Malaysian singer
 January 16 – Aaliyah Haughton, American singer, actress, and model (d. 2001)
 January 20
 Rob Bourdon (Linkin Park)
 Will Young, British singer
 Joel Pott, English musician, producer and songwriter. (Shura, George Ezra) 
 February 1 
 Valentín Elizalde, Regional Mexican singer
 Jason Isbell, American singer-songwriter and guitarist (Drive-By Truckers)
 Julie Roberts, American country singer-songwriter 
 February 10 – Daryl Palumbo, American musician who fronted bands such as Glassjaw
 February 11 – Brandy Norwood, American singer, songwriter, record producer, and actress
 February 12 – Jade Jones (singer), British singer and chef, Emma Bunton's partner
 February 14 – Tsakane Valentine Maswanganyi, South African operatic and concert soprano
 February 15 – Adam Granduciel, American musician
 February 21 – Jennifer Love Hewitt,  American actress, television producer, director, singer-songwriter, and author\
February 22 - Jessica Kiper  "Sugar", American actress, singer, reality TV star and actress
 February 26 – Corinne Bailey Rae, British singer, songwriter, record producer, and guitarist
 March 4 –  Merrill Garbus, multi-instrumentalist, singer-songwriter, activist, art-pop musician (Tune-Yards) 
 March 7 – Amanda Somerville,  American singer-songwriter and vocal coach
 March 8 – Tom Chaplin, British singer (Keane)
 March 9 – Oscar Isaac,  Guatemalan-American actor and musician (Sucker Punch, The Blinking Underdogs, Inside Llewyn Davis) 
 March 11
 Benji Madden, American lead guitar for Good Charlotte
 Joel Madden, American lead vocals for Good Charlotte
 March 14 – Jacques Brautbar (Phantom Planet)
 March 18 – Adam Levine, American singer, songwriter, multi-instrumentalist, actor, and record producer. (Maroon 5)
 March 20 – Sean Garrett, American musical producer, musician, songwriter (Britney Spears, Beyoncé, Ciara) 
 March 23 – Ariel Rechtshaid, American record producer, audio engineer, mixing engineer, multi-instrumentalist, and songwriter
 March 28 – Shakib Khan, Bangladeshi film actor, producer, singer, film organiser and media personalities
 March 30 – Norah Jones, American singer-songwriter, pianist 
 April 1 – Mikko Franck, Finnish violinist and conductor
 April 8 – Alexi Laiho,  Finnish guitarist, composer, and vocalist. (d. 2020)
 April 10 – Sophie Ellis-Bextor, British singer-songwriter-dancer, daughter of Janet Ellis
 April 11
 Danielle de Niese, Australian-American lyric soprano.
 Chris Gaylor, drummer (The All-American Rejects)
 Sebastien Grainger (Death from Above 1979)
 April 13 – Tony Lundon (Liberty X)
 April 20 – Quinn Weng,  Taiwanese-Canadian mezzo-soprano singer (Seraphim)
 April 22 – Daniel Johns, Australian musician, singer, and songwriter (Silverchair)
 April 29
 Jo O'Meara, English singer and actress (S Club 7)
 Matt Tong, drummer (Bloc Party)
 May 4 – Lance Bass, American singer,  dancer, actor, film, and television producer, and author ('N Sync)
 May 9 
 Ara Mina, Filipino actress and singer
 Andrew W.K., American singer-songwriter, multi-instrumentalist, and music producer. 
 Matt Morris,  American singer, producer, actor, and songwriter.
 May 14 – Dan Auerbach, American musician, singer-songwriter, and record producer (The Black Keys, Patrick Carney)
 May 21 – Sonja Vectomov, Czech-Finnish musical artist
 May 29 – Scribe (rapper), a New Zealand hip hop rapper and recording artist of Samoan descent
 June 5 – Pete Wentz, American musician, multi-instrumentalist, writer, mental health advocate, and songwriter (Fall Out Boy) 
 June 8 – Derek Trucks, guitarist, songwriter
 June 12 – Robyn, Swedish singer, songwriter, and record producer
 June 17 – Young Maylay, American rapper, producer, and voice actor
 June 19 – Robby De Sá, South African musician, music producer, and instrumentalist
 June 26 – Ryan Tedder, American singer, songwriter, multi-instrumentalist, and record producer. (OneRepublic) (Hilary Duff, Taylor Swift, Selena Gomez, Jennifer Lopez) 
 June 29 – Abz Love, singer (5ive)
 July 4 – Dumas, Canadian singer-songwriter and guitarist
 July 5 – Shane Filan, Irish singer and songwriter (Westlife)
 July 6 – Matthew Barnson, American viola player and composer
 July 13 – Ladyhawke (musician), New Zealand born singer, songwriter, and multi-instrumentalist 
 July 15 – Laura Benanti, American actress and singer 
 July 16 – Ivan Tásler
 July 17 – Solé, American rapper
 July 25 – Amy Adams, singer
 July 26 – Tamyra Gray, singer
August 7 - Gangsta Boo, American rapper (D.2023)
 August 13 – Amiel Daemion, American-Australian pop singer, songwriter, and actress.
 August 20 – Jamie Cullum, English jazz-pop singer-songwriter, pianist
 August 21 – Kelis, American singer-songwriter and chef
 August 23 – Ritchie Neville, singer (5ive)
 August 27 – Jon Siebels, guitarist (Eve 6)
 August 31 – Yuvan Shankar Raja, film composer and singer
 September 3 – Jason McCaslin, bass guitarist (Sum 41)
 September 6 – Foxy Brown, American rapper, model, and actress
 September 8 – Pink, American singer-songwriter, dancer, musician, and activist
 September 16 – Flo Rida, American rapper and singer
 September 21
 Maija Kovaļevska, Latvian soprano opera singer
 Jericho Rosales, Filipino entertainer
 September 22 – Emilie Autumn, American violinist, singer, poet, mental health advocate, and songwriter
 September 24 – Julia Clarete, Filipina singer, actress, performer, television personality, and former host of Eat Bulaga!
 October 3 – Josh Klinghoffer, guitarist, (Red Hot Chili Peppers)
 October 9 – Alex Greenwald, vocals, rhythm guitar for Phantom Planet
 October 10 – Mýa, American recording artist, songwriter, and actress.
 October 12 – Jordan Pundik, lead vocals for New Found Glory
 October 15
 Jaci Velasquez, Latin pop singer
 Yoav,  singer-songwriter of Israeli-Romanian descent, raised in South Africa.
 October 18 – Ne-Yo, American singer, songwriter, record producer, dancer, television host/judge, and actor. (Jennifer Lopez, Rihanna, World Of Dance) 
 October 24 – Ben Gillies, Australian drummer (Silverchair)
 October 25 – Bat for Lashes, English singer, songwriter, and multi-instrumentalist
 November 9 – Nicolas Koeckert, German violinist
 November 10 – Chris Joannou, Australian musician, bass guitar for Silverchair
 November 22 – Scott Robinson, singer (5ive)
 November 28 – Chamillionaire, American rapper
 November 29 – The Game, American rapper
 December 3 – Daniel Bedingfield, English-New Zealand singer, songwriter, and record producer.
 December 7 – Sara Bareilles, American singer-songwriter, actress, and author.
 December 14 – Sophie Monk,  Australian singer, songwriter, actress, model, and radio personality. 
 December 15 
 Alex Solowitz, American actor, composer, singer, dancer, and producer (2gether)
 Adam Brody, an American actor, writer, musician, and producer. (Leighton Meester, Big Japan) 
 December 26 – Chris Daughtry,  American singer, songwriter, musician, and actor
 December 30 – Yelawolf, American rapper, singer-songwriter, musician, and producer
 December 31 – Bob Bryar, American retired musician, drummer (My Chemical Romance)
 Unknown: Ingrid Michaelson, American singer-songwriter, actress, and activist
 Ms. Jade, American rapper

Deaths
 January 5 – Charles Mingus, jazz musician, 56
 January 13
 Donny Hathaway, singer, 33 (injuries from fall)
 Marjorie Lawrence, operatic soprano, 71
 February 2 – Sid Vicious, punk rocker, 21
 March 4 – Mike Patto, rock singer, 36 (cancer)
 March 5 – Alan Crofoot, operatic tenor and host of Mr Piper, 49 (suicide) 
 March 13 – Harrison Keller, US violinist and music teacher, 90
 March 22 – Walter Legge, record producer, 72
 March 23 – Antonio Brosa, violinist, 84
 April 3 – Ernst Glaser, Norwegian violinist, conductor and music teacher, 75
 April 10 – Nino Rota, composer, 67 (coronary thrombosis)
 April 16 – Maria Caniglia, operatic soprano, 73
 April 29 – Julia Perry, composer and conductor, 55
 May 1 – Bronislav Gimpel, violinist, 68
 May 9 – Zoltán Kelemen, operatic bass-baritone, 53
 May 11 – Lester Flatt, bluegrass musician, 64
 May 21 – Blue Mitchell, trumpeter, 49
 June 5 – Jack Haley, actor, singer (Wizard of Oz) 80
 June 21 – Angus MacLise, American drummer and songwriter (Velvet Underground and Theatre of Eternal Music), 41 (hypoglycemia and pulmonary tuberculosis)
 June 29 – Lowell George, singer, songwriter and guitarist, founder of Little Feat, 34 (heart attack)
 July 3 – Louis Durey, composer, 91
 July 6 – Van McCoy, singer, 35 (heart attack)
 July 12 – Minnie Riperton, singer, 31 (breast cancer)
 July 14 – Pedro Flores, composer, 85
 July 16 – Alfred Deller, countertenor, 67
 August 19 – Dorsey Burnette, Rockabilly singer, 46 (heart attack)
 August 25 – Stan Kenton, bandleader, 67
 September 2 – Jacques Février, pianist, 79
 September 6 – Guy Bolton, English librettist, 94
 September 22 – Richard Nibley, violinist, 66
 September 27
 Gracie Fields, actress and singer, 81
 Jimmy McCulloch, guitarist (Wings), 26
 October 1 – Roy Harris, composer, 81
 October 13 – Rebecca Helferich Clarke, viola player and composer, 93
 October 22 – Nadia Boulanger, French composer, conductor, and music teacher, 92
 October 27 – Germaine Lubin, operatic soprano, 89
 November 11 – Dimitri Tiomkin, film composer and conductor, 85
 November 13 – Freda Betti, French mezzo-soprano opera singer, 55
 November 17 – John Glascock, rock bassist, 28
 November 23 – Judee Sill, singer-songwriter, 35
 November 30 – Joyce Grenfell, actress and singer-songwriter, 69
 December 21 – Nansi Richards, harpist, 91
 December 30 – Richard Rodgers, composer and songwriter, 77

Awards
 Grammy Awards of 1979
 1979 Country Music Association Awards
 Eurovision Song Contest 1979
 Japan Music Awards
 21st Japan Record Awards

See also
 Record labels established in 1979
 1979 in music (UK)

References

External links

 
20th century in music
Music by year